Kenjiro Kawasaki (川崎 憲次郎, born January 8, 1971) is a former Nippon Professional Baseball pitcher.

External links

1971 births
Living people
Baseball people from Ōita Prefecture
Japanese baseball players
Nippon Professional Baseball pitchers
Yakult Swallows players
Chunichi Dragons players
Japanese baseball coaches
Nippon Professional Baseball coaches